Mitchellstown is a locality in north east Victoria, Australia.

Named after Major Thomas Mitchell who crossed the Goulburn River here in 1836 during his Third Expedition.
 

References

External links

Towns in Victoria (Australia)
Shire of Strathbogie